Beacon Dome is a large dome-like mountain in Antarctica. It was mapped by the United States Geological Survey from surveys and from U.S. Navy air photos, 1960–64, and was so named by the New Zealand Geological Survey Antarctic Expedition (1969–70) because the mountain is composed of a granite basement with horizontally layered rocks of the Beacon Supergroup above.

References
 

Mountains of Marie Byrd Land